Professor Julio Escudero Base is a permanent Chilean Antarctic research base. It is located on King George Island near Base Presidente Eduardo Frei Montalva and the civilian settlement of Villa Las Estrellas. It lies within the Antártica Chilean commune funded by the Antarctic Institute of the Ministry of Foreign Relations.

See also
 List of Antarctic research stations
 List of Antarctic field camps

References

External links
 Official website Chilean Antarctic Institute
 COMNAP Antarctic Facilities
 COMNAP Antarctic Facilities Map

Chilean Antarctic Territory
Outposts of the South Shetland Islands
1995 establishments in Antarctica